Allipura  is a village in the southern state of Karnataka, India. t is located in the Gauribidanur taluk of Chikkaballapura district in Karnataka.

Demographics
 India census, Allipura had a population of 9930 with 5119 males and 4811 females.

See also
 Districts of Karnataka
Kadalaveni

References

External links
 http://Kolar.nic.in/

Villages in Kolar district